Tushar Kapadia(Gujarati: તુષાર કાપડિયા, Hindi: तुषार कापडिया) is an Indian actor. He is well-known artist of Gujarati Theater world. He is popular nowadays as Mr. Abhyankar Jobanputra among Gujarati people, as he is doing a TV serial named 'Aa Family Comedy Che'. He is active in entertainment world since 1987 and have done more than 30 TV serial as an actor.

Theater

Television

Filmography

Awards and achievements

References

Male actors from Gujarat
1969 births
Living people